Tanah Merah District (meaning Red Land or Laterite, Kelantanese: Tanoh Meghoh; Jawi:‌‌ تانه ميره) is a district (jajahan) in the state of Kelantan in northeast Malaysia. The urban area of Tanah Merah is situated along the Kelantan River. It is bordered by Pasir Mas District in the north, Machang District to the East, Kuala Krai District to the South East, Jeli District to the South West and Thailand in the West.

Historically it used to be a capital of a kingdom called Chi Tu. Chinese Sui Dynasty annals of the 7th century describe an advanced kingdom called Chi Tu ("Red Earth") in the area now called Kelantan. The ancient name for Kelantan was "Raktamrittika", meaning "Red Earth" — this was later changed to "Sri Wijaya Mala".

Education 
Several types of school can be found in Tanah Merah. Among the schools in Tanah Merah are
Maahad Ahmadi, Padang Siam, 17500  Tanah Merah (Sekolah agama yang perlukan bantuan)
Sekolah Menengah Kebangsaan Alor Pasir, 17500 Tanah Merah
Sekolah Menengah Kebangsaan Batu Gajah, 17510 Tanah Merah
Sekolah Menengah Kebangsaan Belimbing, Jln. Tanah Merah-Pasir Mas, 17500 Tanah Merah
Sekolah Menengah Kebangsaan Dato' Mahmud Paduka Raja (1), 17500 Tanah Merah
Sekolah Menengah Kebangsaan Ipoh, 17500 Tanah Merah
Sekolah Menengah Kebangsaan Kemahang, W/P Felda Kemahang, 17500 Tanah Merah
Sekolah Menengah Kebangsaan Ladang Kerilla, Peti Surat 39, 17507 Tanah Merah
Sekolah Menengah Kebangsaan Tanah Merah (1), 17500 Tanah Merah
Sekolah Menengah Kebangsaan Tanah Merah (2)(SEMETAM2), 17500 Tanah Merah
Kolej Vokasional Tanah Merah, Km.3, Jln. Tanah Merah-Machang, 17500 Tanah Merah
Sekolah Menengah Kebangsaan Bukit Bunga, 17500 Tanah Merah
Sekolah Menengah Kebangsaan Dato Mahmud Paduka Raja (2), 17500 Tanah Merah

Demographics 

The total population in 2020 was about 151,000, the majority being Malays, with a small Chinese and Indian population. Immigrants, mostly from neighbouring Thailand, also make up a part of the population.

Most of the population be distributed among various villages (or "kampung" in Malay) and suburb areas, while only a small proportion is located in the town.

Tanah Merah used to be a small town, but has seen major changes in the last decade when the younger generation started to migrate to cities along the Malaysian west coast for jobs with higher pay. Money sent back to their families has catalysed the growth, expansion and development of the town.

Ranking Population of Jajahan Tanah Merah.

Geography
The landscape of Tanah Merah is greatly influenced by the Kelantan River (Malay: Sungai Kelantan) which supplies much needed water to its agricultural plantations. Mt. Kemahang and Mt. Kusial are both located in the western part of Tanah Merah.

Federal Parliament and State Assembly Seats 

List of Tanah Merah district representatives in the Federal Parliament (Dewan Rakyat) 

List of LMS district representatives in the State Legislative Assembly.

Transportation 
Highway 4 is the main highway serving the constituency. Highway 129 is a shortcut to Pasir Mas.

KTM Intercity has a station in Tanah Merah town.

Shopping
Aneka
Jaya Gading
Pantai Timor Shopping Centre
Salamku
Tesco (proposed)
Merah Mall (upcoming projects)

References